The Pushpa Gujral Science City or PGSC is located on outskirts of Kapurthala on the Kapurthala-Jalandhar road. The foundation stone of PGSC was laid by the then prime minister Inder Kumar Gujral on 17 October 1997. The science city has been named after mother of Inder Kumar Gujral and jointly funded by Government of India and the Punjab Government. The first director general of PGSC, Raghbir Singh Khandpur has been credited with having conceptualised this centre.

Facilities
Galleries
Science Voyage Hall
Theatre
Energy Park
Mobile Science van

See also
Science City Kolkata

References

Kapurthala
Science and technology in Punjab, India
Science museums in India